Panagiotis Hatzikyriakakis was a Greek swimmer. He competed in the men's 100 metre freestyle at the 1948 Summer Olympics. He played at club level for Ethnikos Piraeus.

References

Year of birth missing (living people)
Living people
Greek male swimmers
Olympic swimmers of Greece
Swimmers at the 1948 Summer Olympics
Place of birth missing (living people)
Greek male freestyle swimmers

Ethnikos Piraeus Water Polo Club players